Irina Fedotova is a Russian LGBT and human rights activist. She filed the case Fedotova v. Russia (1932/2010) with the United Nations Human Rights Committee to challenge the gay propaganda law in Ryazan and also the case Fedotova and Others v. Russia with the European Court of Human Rights, which ruled in 2021 that Russia had violated her rights by failing to provide any recognition to her same-sex relationship.

References

Russian LGBT rights activists
Living people
Year of birth missing (living people)